Filipino hip-hop or Pinoy hip hop (also known as Pinoy rap) is hip hop music performed by musicians of Filipino descent, both in the Philippines and overseas, especially by Filipino-Americans.

The Philippines is known to have had the first hip hop music scene in Asia since the early 1980s, largely due to the country's historical connections with the United States where hip hop originated. Rap music released in the Philippines has appeared in different languages or dialects such as Tagalog, Bicolano, Chavacano, Cebuano, Ilocano and English. In the Philippines, Francis Magalona and Andrew E. are among the most influential rappers in the country, being the first to release mainstream rap albums. Apl.de.ap of the Black Eyed Peas, Cassie Ventura and Chad Hugo of the Neptunes and N.E.R.D. are among the contemporary Filipino-American hip-hop artists.

History

Origins
The towns surrounding the numerous American military bases that were scattered throughout that country such as Clark Air Base in Angeles City and Subic Bay Naval Base in Olongapo were among the earliest to be exposed to the culture. As contact with African-American, Filipino-American and Latino servicemen resulted in some of the earliest exposure the locals had to the new musical genre.

1980s: Seeds of a movement
In 1980, the earliest rap recording came from Dyords Javier's single "Na Onseng Delight", a parody of "Rapper's Delight" by the Sugarhill Gang, released under Wea Records. That same year, pioneer Vincent Dafalong released the singles, "Ispraken-Delight" and "Mahiwagang Nunal".

Groundbreaking hip hop films such as Wild Style (1982), Breakin' (1984) and Krush Groove (1985) were influences. In 1982, local breakdancing crews like the Angeles City-based Whooze Co. International, with members consisting primarily from Clark Air Base, The Eclipse (whose former members included Francis Magalona, Dance 10 1983 champion Darwin Tuason and current Federation Sounds' Glenn "Kico" Lelay), Info-Clash Breakers and Ground Control (whose members included Rap Master Fordy, later to be known as Andrew E.), and Jay "Smooth" MC of Bass Rhyme Posse became mainstays in local parks and malls in and around the Metro Manila area such as the Glorietta mall, which was an early hotspot for breakers. Several mobile DJ crews of the era included such names as the Rock All Parties Crew which emerged onto the scene only to produce future Pinoy rap pioneers such as Andrew E. and Norman B.

1990s: Old School Hip-Hop

The genre soon entered the mainstream with Francis Magalona's debut album, Yo! (1990), which included the nationalistic hit "Mga Kababayan" ("My Countrymen"), which brought Magalona to prominence.

More artists followed in Magalona's footsteps. The list includes Andrew E. who released his first single, "Humanap Ka ng Pangit" ("Look for Someone Ugly") in 1990 and Michael V. with the release of his first song "Maganda ang Piliin" ("Pick Someone Pretty") in 1991, a companion piece to Andrew E.'s "Humanap Ka ng Pangit".

Known as the "golden age" of Pinoy hip hop, the 1990s marked the beginning of many rapid stylistic innovations beginning in 1991 with the establishment of the Disco Mix Club Philippines which was one of the earliest platforms for Philippine DJ mixing battles. Early innovators of the style included DJs Carlo Yalo, Noel Macanaya, Rod "DVS" Torres and Omar Lacap, among others.

Following the path set forth by their Bass Rhyme predecessors, the tri-lingual rap group Rapasia released their self-titled debut record in 1991, garnering the hit "Hoy! Tsismosa". One of the earliest Filipino hip hop groups to embrace such an abstract format, the album's lyrical content often contained a mixture of various Philippine languages (including Tagalog and Chavacano) along with English. Rapasia's innovative style was built upon years later by other Pinoy rap groups such as Zamboanga's Ghost 13. Rapasia's members included Martin "Bronx" Magalona, brother of Pinoy rap entrepreneur Francis Magalona. The other two members are Filipino-American, Ronald Jamias a.k.a. Ronski J and the Tausug-born Ben Mohammad a.k.a. Brother BM. The group was initiated via an International Rap Competition sponsored by VIVA Records and was held at the Music Museum in Mandaluyong. Andrew E emceed the program.

Mastaplann was also another group that did all their music in English. The group had three DJs and two MCs. The MCs were known as Type (Johnny Luna) and Tracer One (Butch Velez, brother of actress Vivian Velez). They released three albums that went multi-platinum. The group was formed in 1992 in the Philippines, with original group members Butch Velez a.k.a. Tracer One, Johnny Luna a.k.a. Type Slickk, Disco Mix Competition DJs Sonny Abad, Noel Macanaya a.k.a. DJ MOD, Lopie Guzman a.k.a. DJ Ouch (also of 89.1 DMZ-FM and RSL Sound & Lighting Company), and managed by Jesse Gonzales and DJ Gilby. Butch and Johnny were balikbayans from the San Fernando Valley near Los Angeles, Sonny a balikbayan from Hercules near the San Francisco Bay Area and Noel and Lopie native Filipinos. In 1992, Mastaplann was signed by Universal Records, where they released two records; their debut eponymous release in 1993, and in 1994, The Way of tha Plann. These albums eventually obtained platinum status.

The pioneering Pinoy hip hop act Bass Rhyme Posse released their self-titled debut album on VIVA Records in 1991, which spawned the cult hits "Let the Beat Flow", "Buhay Estudyante" ("Student Life") and "Juan T.", becoming the genre's first rap group to release a record.

1992 marked a turning point for Pinoy rap with the release of Francis M's influential second album, Rap Is Francis M, which is regarded as one of the greatest Pinoy rap albums ever. Ushering in a socially awoken wave not seen in the Philippine music industry since the heyday of Juan De La Cruz, Sampaguita and 1970s Pinoy rock, Magalona's tracks dissected the various cultural, social and political problems that plagued his country such as drug addiction in "Mga Praning" ("The Addicts"), political corruption and instability in "Halalan" ("Election") as well as the detrimental effects of a colonial mentality to Filipino culture in "Tayo'y Mga Pinoy" ("We Are Filipinos"). The record's complexity and socially sentient message quickly earned it its classic status and became the standard by which future albums of the genre were to be compared to. Magalona's enduring contributions to the genre was recognized in the All Music Guide to Hip-Hop: The Definitive Guide to Rap and Hip-Hop (2003) published by Backbeat Books; as well as in the U.S.-based hip hop publication The Source (May 2004).

Another Filipino hip hop artist who achieved prominence during the 1990s is the formerly Los Angeles-based DJ Andrew E (born Andrew Espiritu), whose tracks "Humanap Ka ng Panget" ("Look for Someone Ugly") and "Makati Girl" (as done by Norman B. of Bass Rhyme Posse; the first Pinoy rap track recorded to contain beatboxing) became big hits in the Philippines, rivaling even Francis M's previously untouchable reign on top. Prior to landing a recording contract, the rapper had competed in various rap contests around the Philippines; the likes of which also produced Pinoy rap stars Michael V., Denmark and Martin "Bronx" Magalona. Andrew E's 1991 hit "Humanap Ka ng Pangit" was the first to spawn a plethora of response records from other rappers in the country, such as Michael V's "Maganda ang Piliin" ("Pick Someone Pretty"). The rapper's ability to combine unique storytelling with raunchy and humorous wordplay laced with catchy beats made Andrew the first of his kind in the genre. He then went on to release a movie titled Andrew Ford Medina: Huwag Kang Gamol in 1991 which was the first film in the Philippines to include a full-on freestyle battle on screen. By the mid-1990s, he had established his own record label, Dongalo Wreckords, as well as many successful rap groups, including Cebuano rappers The Anthill Mobb, Madd Poets and Bicolano rappers Salbakuta. The former, known for their complex and versatile lyrical ability, achieved fame with their debut album Ikatlong Mundo. In 1997, Andrew E produced and hosted the first Pinoy rap television show, Rap 13.

1994 saw the emergence of another rap group, headed by a female balikbayan from New York. The group called 4 East Flava consisted of three homegrown rapistas - Von "Mack" Padua (who was molded by Martin "The Bronxman" Magalona and now with the group Pinoy Republic), Bernard "P-Slick" Santiago, and Paul "Shorty" Navarro, two DJs (DJ Edge and DJ Mec), and Jug "Honeyluv" Ramos, hailing from New York who was known as "the rose among the thorns". They brought out the hit "Check the Hood" (used for a shoe commercial) which was misunderstood as a diss towards Mastaplann.

The same year, going against the wave of radio-friendly rap tracks that dominated at the time, the group Death Threat, founded by rappers Beware and Genezide, released the first Filipino gangsta rap album which told tales of the daily lives and struggles impoverished Filipino youth faced growing up in the slums of Metro Manila titled Gusto Kong Bumaet (I Want to Be Good).

In 1997, the underground Pinoy rap group Pamilia Dimagiba released their album Broke-N-Unsigned on Tenement Records, marking the re-emergence of the conscious emcee in Pinoy rap. A coalition of sorts, Pamilia Dimagiba composed itself of several underground Pinoy rappers and crews such as 8th Messenger, Shadowblyde, Spoon, Murder-1 of Khan's Assassins, and Young Galaxy of Iron Triangle, among others. The raw seven-track, politically minded album was a breath of fresh air at the time, as Pinoy rap during the era had taken a more hardcore, gangster persona. Known for their coarse lyrics, serious subject matter complemented by heavy beats fused within traditional Filipino folk music, the camp's records "Duelo", "Manila's Finest", "Reality Hurtz" and "Brainstorming" among others were largely in essence a throwback to the early, nationalistic Francis M inspired days of the genre.

The same year, the very first Filipino Rap record label Dongalo Wreckords was established.

The widespread popularity of Pinoy rap in and around the islands has resulted in the spawning of a new breed of Pinoy emcees: junior "rapistas". Far from being a new trend, Jaymie "Baby" Magtoto and her 1991 hit single "Eh! Kasi Bata" ("Cause I'm a Kid") was an early example of Pinoy kiddie rappers. The single was also included in the soundtrack for Magtoto's motion picture debut of the same name released later that year.

The 2000s saw the resurgence of grade school rappers in Filipino hip hop. In 2001, Rap Group Salbakuta (under Dongalo Wreckords) became a phenomenal through its first single, Stupid Luv and was later adapted to a movie. 2005 was a breakthrough for kid rappers in the Philippines as Aikee, through the Madd World/Circulo Pugantes Camp released his debut Ang Bawat Bata (Every Child) on Alpha Music and at eleven years of age, became the youngest Filipino rapper to release a full rap album.

2000s: The rise of Philippine hip hop scene

In the new millennium, Filipino hip-hop rivalled Pinoy rock's traditional popularity amongst Filipino youth. Artists who are currently active and have released both rap albums and music videos in the Philippines since 1990 include Andrew E, Denmark, Beware, K-Ozz, Michael V. and Gloc-9. Other popular rap artists and groups of the 2000s included 2 High, 6 Signs, 7 Shots of Wisdom, 8th District, Anak ni Bakuko, Lawiboi, Apokalipsis, Artstrong, Akuma, Bass Rhyme Posse, BB Clan, Black Pro, Blanktape, Boom, Brownstyle, C-4, Candy Cousart, Chill, Chinese Mafia, Circulo Pugantes, Cris Asero, Cypha-Sis, Dagtang Lason, D.O.P.E. Rekordz, D-Coy, Deceivious, DFT, Death Threat, Defuca Zapata, Down Earf, Dugong Pasay, Dugong Ponebre, EHP, El Latino, Flipz, Fungzoi, Genezide, Ghetto Doggs, Gio Alvarez, Grounded, H-Bom, Heaven Scent, Hidyas Clan, Hi-Jakkk, IPK, Jawtee, John Rendez, Johnny Krush, K-9 Killaz, Kain @ Abel, Karayama, Katuga, Kawago, KFS, Kruzzada, Kulay, Kut-5 Trilogy, Lady Diane, Legit Misfitz, L-Smith, Lyrical Assault, Madd Poets, Mastershock, MC Lara, M.C.M.C., MC Dash Calzado, Mega Force Crew (formerly known as Grand Assault Tribe), Rapskallion Familia, SYKE, O-Man, O.G. Sacred 1, DMJ, Mike Kosa, Mike Swift, Godswill, Mista Blaze, Misteazas, Nuztradamuz, OBLAXZ, Quickie, Rap Asia, Razzamanazz, Renegade Souljaz, Sakit ng Sucat, Salbakuta, Seedz, Sly Kane, Stick Figgas, Sun Valley Crew, Syke, Urban Flow, and Verbal Sativa.

In 2000, the golden-era rap group Mastaplann released a third album through BMG Records, under the new sub-label, Francis M's Red Egg Records, titled Mastaplann.com, a reference to their newly developed website. Additionally, the group scaled down their line-up to just Butch and Johnny, and then added Johnny Krush, another balikbayan from the San Francisco area. This album has already obtained gold status in the Philippines. Currently, the group is based in the States where they still perform and make music. Mastaplann is currently working on their fourth album, yet to be titled, to be released under True Asiatik Productionz.

Since 2004, the Philippine Hip-Hop Music Awards has been held annually in Metro Manila. The show is reminiscent of The Source Awards in the US. Gloc-9, considered to be the fastest rapper in the Philippines and former member of the rap group Death Threat, held the title for Best Rap Artist at the awards show for four consecutive years, from 2005 to 2008, achieving mainstream popularity and releasing successful commercial albums every other year. Like the American hip hop industry, music videos have become an important trend (even containing small cameos from different Filipino rappers) and air on TV channels like MTV Philippines and MYX. Despite Metro Manila's powerful position over the music industry, rap groups in the south have started to gain their own share of popularity, like Dice & K9 a.k.a. Mobbstarr from Cebu City with their first hit single "Itsumo" in 2003, Thavawenyoz from Davao City with their debut album Hubag in 2005, and Zambo Top Dogz from Zamboanga City, known for their Chavacano rapping in the songs "Noticias" and "Conversa Ta". It is also not uncommon for Filipino-American artists to perform live, sell records, and win awards in the Philippines while living in the States, for example Pikaso from San Francisco, California who won the Producer of the Year award in 2008.

In 2002, Carlo Maniquiz and Nick Tuason, together with the assistance of FUBU's headquarters in New York City, established the FUBU Philippines clothing line, opening up several stores in the Philippines. In promotion of the new franchise, Francis M released a compilation album showcasing new local hip hop talent as well as two volumes of Tha Rappublic of the Philippines series, which featured young unsigned Filipino rap artists that were discovered through the nationwide talent search of the same name (including groups Crazy as Pinoy, Kamandag ng Marikina, and the Stick Figgas). Francis M went on to form his own clothing line in 2006 called Francis Magalona Clothing Company (FMCC) which are sold at his own branches of stores called Three Stars & a Sun. The F-Word was an album Francis M was rumored to be working on in 2008 to follow his last album from 2000, but leukemia and other health problems interfered later that year.

The popularity of artists such as Dice & K9 a.k.a. Mobbstarr (known for their popular Japanese and English combination hit song "Itsumo"), Pikaso, Audible, and Krook and J.O.L.O., who primarily use English lyrics in their tracks, has given way to the ongoing divide between Tagalog lyricists and English lyricists. With English tracks dominating the airwaves, several Tagalog-based emcees felt a sort of bias in the Philippine music industry, which favors artists who use English rather than Filipino. The conflict over language became evident in the 2004 Black Eyed Peas concert in Manila in which rapper Mike Swift's Tagalog-based track was cut short halfway through the song due to the "English Only" policy enforced by the event's organizers towards Black Eyed Peas' opening acts.

Rap group Salbakuta, under Andrew E's Dongalo Wreckords, recorded the track "Ayoko ng Ganitong...", which contained lyrics partly attacking such "English Only" Pinoy rap artists.

In 2006, the group Stick Figgas, runners-up in Francis M's Rappublic of the Philippines talent search, released their debut album Critical Condition under joint-release with Dice & K9's 6000 Goonz imprint and Francis M's Red Egg Records sub-label, which, amidst critical acclaim, sparked a resurgence and renaissance of sorts in Tagalog rap. The Stick Figgas relied on clever punchlines, creative lyricism and intricate rhyme schemes, re-introducing a technical poignancy that has been absent in Tagalog rap since B.B. Clan's first album Mabanges. This rap style has arguably inspired the current generation of Tagalog rappers to place much more emphasis on multi-syllable rhyme schemes, punchlines and metaphors than before.

In 2009, after the death of Francis Magalona, independent rap labels and production emerged in the local rap scene such as Wika Records of D-Coy and PR Records and Entertainment (as owned by Von Padua of Pinoy Republic), Pikaso's Hustlin Records, Longevity Records and Turbulence Records, and Young JV's Doin' It Big Productions. Pinoy hip hop fashion has also emerged such as Pinoy Republic, Turf Clothing, Rapista Clothing, Boss Balita and Wika following Francis M's clothing line FMCC.

2010s: FlipTop battle league, trap genre emergence and second golden age

The influence of the original rap battle leagues in the West – Grind Time Now (U.S.), King of the Dot (Canada) and Don't Flop (UK) – all founded in 2008, inspired the creation of other battle leagues around the world, FlipTop being one of them, in 2010. This local rap battle competition typically involves both parties (either 2 rappers or 2 duos) hailing mudslinging words and rhymes at each other, who are then judged at the end based on a number of factors including flow and use of insults/punchlines and audience impact. The one with the most votes from the judges is declared winner. Some popular artists who participate in FlipTop include Loonie, Smugglaz, Abra, Dello, Bassilyo, Batas and BLKD. Many other amateur rap battles arose such as Sunugan, Bolero Rap Battles, Bahay Katay, etc. The emcees also began to make and produce their own music.

Famous battle emcees turned musicians from the early 2010s period include Abra, Shehyee, Loonie, Smugglaz and Bassilyo. Shehyee signed with Viva Records while Loonie and Bassilyo signed with Universal Records and MCA Music, respectively. However, Abra founded his own Artifice Records that eventually became defunct.

During the late 2000s up to the early 2010s, some Filipino rap artists began to concentrate and incorporate homosexuality issues into their songs. In 2009, an indie rap group named Dagtang Lason released a song called "Nagmahal Ako ng Bakla", a song about lads who prefer to love a gay because of their disappointment with girls. The song became popular among teens, Internet cafés and the jejemon culture at the time. In 2012, Gloc-9 released the song "Sirena", in which the music video features a gay person from his childhood to teenage years being abused by his father. Also in 2012, Abra released "Gayuma", which features a man who is in love with his partner, but it turns out the partner is a gay, which the man realizes later on after being given a potion.

By 2015, several prominent trap and hip-hop recording artists emerged with notable hits including unknowns from the underground scene. The most popular artists which carries styles mixed with R&B associated with trap beats influenced by Western hip-hop nowadays includes hip-hop collective Ex Battalion (whose hit "Hayaan Mo Sila" almost topped the now defunct Billboard Philippines Top 20 chart) and teen artists Shanti Dope (with hits including "Nadarang" and Mau"), kiyo, Angelo Acosta and Because. Rising star BJ Castillano (popularly known as Because) struck a deal with Viva Records after his track titled "Marlboro Black", first released on the platform SoundCloud became popular. Other names include Al James, Arvey, Skusta Clee and his own trap/hip-hop trio, O.C. Dawgs, with the track "Pauwi Nako" that became a nationwide hit in 2019. Filipino hip-hop acts also began to incorporate trending hip-hop sub-genres from the U.S. in their tracks such as lo-fi and trap soul. Significant projects of the time included Gatilyo (BLKD), The Lesser of Your Greater Friends (Calix), Manila Circle Jerk (Den Sy Ty), IKUGAN (Calix), as well as BLKD and Calix's collaborative effort Kolateral. Hip-hop groups like ALLMO$T and Manila Grey (based in Canada) also made a huge influence and garnered tens of millions of streams from Filipino music listeners in 2019. Their tracks were used in social media challenges like the "Dalagang Pilipina Challenge" which uses the track "Dalaga" by ALLMO$T, one of the most streamed hip-hop tracks in 2019.

Since 2017, the local hip-hop underground scene led by prominent hip-hop collectives such as Baryo Berde, 727 Clique, OWFUCK, 357 Pro (Rekta Sa Kalye) and Bawal Clan were established.

2020s: The expansion of Pinoy hip hop scene
In late 2019, MCA Music (now UMG/UMUSIC Philippines) launched Def Jam Philippines, a new label dedicated to established and up-and-coming hip hop and R&B acts. 

In 2021, 8 Ballin', a hip hop collective group from Rizal, took the Pinoy hip hop spotlight after the music video of their controversial hit single "Know Me" became viral on YouTube and has been became the talk of the town on social media because of memes and their mumble rapping, and caught the attention of Def Jam Philippines which led the collective group to join the label.

The 2020s also gave the rise of Filipino-American rapper Ez Mil. He gained fame in 2021 after his performance of his song "Panalo (Trap Cariñosa)" on the Wish Bus USA went viral, amassing millions of views in just a few days after premiering on YouTube on January 29.

Other elements of hip hop

The art of MCing or rapping in Filipino hip hop is also represented in other forms such as battle rapping or freestyling. Several annual contests such as the Fête de la Musique, the Blazin' Freestyle Battle and PR's Rap Mania are held annually within the Philippines specifically aimed at showcasing such talents, often drawing masses of undiscovered, amateur Pinoy "rapistas".

Artists representing other elements include b-boy crews such as The Battle Krew (TBK), Funk Roots Crew, Soulstice Crew, Air Grounds Crew, Tru Asiatik Tribe (TAT) and The Balikbayan Tribe (BBT); "grapistas" such as Flip-1, Bonz, Ripe-1, Dope, Chas-1, Meow and Xzyle, and graffiti crews such as Samahan Batang Aerosol (SBA), Pinoy Bomber Crew (PBC), Pinoy Style Insight (PSI), Day Night Bombers (DNB), Katipunan Street Team (KST) and Crime In Style Crew (CIS), as well as beatboxers Christopher Oreo a.k.a. BoomBuster and Cool MC Norman B (of the Bass Rhyme Posse).

Beatbox
Beatboxing is another element of hip-hop; Xam Penalba a.k.a. The Bigg X represented the Philippines at the Beatbox World Championship in May 2015 at the Astra Kulturhaus Berline. He is a member of the Philippine Human Beatbox Alliance and beatbox group Microphone Mechanics with members G-Who, Leaf, Mouthfx and Abdhul.

Filipino-American hip-hop

Birth of a culture
Filipino-American hip-hop culture bases its historical roots in the Filipino American, Latino American and African-American neighborhoods along the West Coast, specifically in Los Angeles, the San Francisco Bay Area, and San Diego. The movement that had been born in the South Bronx among Jamaican, Puerto Rican and African-American youth in turn had its West Coast identity formed within the respective African-American, Filipino and Latino communities. Similar to the Filipino-American zoot suiters, be-boppers and ballroom dancers of previous generations, the dynamics within these respective communities reincarnated itself once again in the form of hip hop. Since the 1990 Census, Filipino Americans have made up the second largest Asian Pacific American group in the United States (after Chinese Americans), and, until 2000, were the largest Asian group in California. In West Coast hip hop, their role has been comparable to that of Puerto Rican artists on the East Coast, who were an integral part, along with African Americans, in the creation of the foundations of hip hop culture.

As early as the late 1970s, during hip hop's infancy, pioneering mobile Bay Area Filipino mobile DJ crews such as Sound Explosion, Unlimited Sounds, Electric Sounds, Fusion, Ladda Sounds, 3-Style Attractions, Ultimate Creations, Sound Patrol, Soundsation, Sound City Productions, Kicks Company, Images, Non-Stop Boogie, Imperial Sounds, Unique Musique, Nite Life Sensations, Rok A Long and Sound Sequence among many others helped capitalize on the massive Filipino party scene by introducing the newly formed genre of music while spreading its popularity throughout South San Francisco and its surrounding areas through paid gigs in house/block parties, family gatherings, school pep rallies, weddings and church halls; primarily playing and mixing electro funk alongside Latin freestyle. Rival crews would often one-up each other by showcasing superior equipment and providing elaborate set-ups. Early mobile DJ stars included DJ Ren (born Rene Anies), founder of one of the first Filipino American DJ crews Electric Sounds, DJ Dynamix (born Dave Refuerzo) of Sound Patrol who established 3-Style Attractions, a widely known mobile DJ crew in the Bay Area, and DJ D-Styles (born Dave Cuasito), who in 1987 established the mobile DJ crew Sound City Productions. In 1983, a real-estate agent by the name of Mark Bradford established Imagine, which began primarily as a showcase for Filipino DJ talent in and around the Bay Area and came to serve as the premier event for DJs until the founders' murder in 1991. The movement reached its pinnacle in 1987, when more than one hundred mobile DJ crews participated in DJ sound clashes and showcases. By the late 1980s, the "mobile DJ" movement had declined in popularity and had given way to the "turntablist", largely due to the rise of Q-Bert and the innovation of scratching within the DJ community. The legacy of the "mobile DJ" lived on however, because many of the Bay Area turntablists that went on to define the art in the 1990s such as Q-Bert himself, along with DJ Shortkut, often had their beginnings in mobile DJ work.  Also in New York City, early hip hop musician and salsa legend Joe Bataan (half Filipino and half African American) had one of the first rap hits, "Rap-O Clap-O" in 1979, released on his Salsoul label. In 1981, DJ Nasty Nes (of Rap Attack and NastyMix Records fame) of Seattle launched the specialty show Fresh Tracks on Seattle's 1250 KFOX introducing the first ever hip-hop radio station on the West Coast. He went on to serve as the DJ for pioneering Seattle rapper Sir Mix-A-Lot.

In the 1980s, several legendary Filipino b-boy groups such as the Renegade Rockers, Knuckleneck Tribe, Rock Force Crew, Daly City Breakers, Jughead Tribe and Concrete Rockers also emerged from the Bay Area rivaling even the New York City-based Rock Steady Crew, whose official West Coast contingent is known to consist of several Filipino American members. Kalifornia Noize Terrorists' Paul Sirate, better known as P-Kid emerged from the Bay Area becoming one of the early premier breakdancers and later went on to MCing and producing, lacing tracks for the likes of the Bronx's Terror Squad and L.A.'s Pharcyde. Elsewhere in the Bay Area, pioneering Filipina rapper Lani Luv (born Melanie Cagonot) became one of the early West Coast female MCs.

Several tagging crews such as Oakland's Those Damn Kids (TDK) were some of the originators of "graf art" on the West Coast. It was during this time in 1983 that TDK's King Dream (born Michael Francisco) surfaced out of the graf art world. Francisco utilized his pieces to celebrate, express and educate from his own Filipino American background in order to promote tolerance while simultaneously strengthening bonds with others from differing cultures, eventually achieving international recognition. Now deceased (Dream was murdered in 2000), he is considered by many to have been one of the greatest and most influential graf writers whose work had been expressive of his urban environment while focusing on social issues concerning not only Filipino Americans, but also other people of color in America such as police brutality, racism, nationwide liberation and rebellion.

Although generally associated with the West Coast with individuals and groups such as Blue Scholars and Native Guns, Filipino American hip hop is increasingly represented by emcees in other regions, from East Coast performers such as Q-York hailing from Queens, New York (currently residing in the Philippines) to Midwestern groups such as Chicago's The Pacifics. West Coast rapper/producer hailing from Los Angeles, Sevenes, is known for his track "Lakas" being the first Tagalog rap song to feature on an American TV show, on NCIS: Los Angeles. Maryland's Gagong Rapper crew gained fame in the early 2000s by flooding the Internet with their home-recordings and heading the underground sub-label Sandamukal Records. L.A.'s Grupo ni Berdugo and Sunog Baga, under F.O.B Entertainment, has recently been making names for themselves, the latter being signed by Andrew E's Dongalo Wreckordz and opening up for Gloc-9's L.A. show. Hailing from San Jose, California, Yung Rizzo of Fly High Music Group, who is another Filipino American solo hip hop artist who has established himself from this region. Yung Rizzo's versatility and unique style of delivery has earned both national and international acclaim. Yung Rizzo debuted the Spotify Viral 50 (Philippines) chart in 2020 and #1 on iTunes Hip Hop Top 200 (Philippines) in 2021 as a 100% independent artist, currently he is working on projects that include singles featuring mainstream artists The Jacka of the Mob Figaz and Mistah F.A.B., who are featured on his debut album Back of My Mind.

Even further north of the American border in Canada, Filipino hip hop has established an active scene, with the likes of Montreal's New Elementz, Vancouver's conscious rap-tandem The On Point Collective, the veteran emcee Jae Spillz, Filipino rapper One3D, and the hip hop power label Cashtown Records; home to a variety of artists including the underground Tagalog emcees Franchizze One and Lyrikal Abstrakt, or Dos Armados, who went on to form their own label subsidiary, Southeast Cartel.

Rise of the turntablists
By the 1990s, hip hop artists of Filipino descent (particularly turntablists like DJ Qbert, Mix Master Mike, and the Invisibl Skratch Piklz) achieved prominence and came to dominate the DJ art form of scratching, introducing the world to a more innovative style of scratching utilizing a wide variety of new techniques, including the playing of actual melodies, as well as the inventions of the "crab scratch", "tweak scratch", "strobing", and furthering the development of "flare scratching".

In 1996, the International Turntable Federation, which hosts the largest international turntablist competitions, was established by Alex Aquino. DJ Glaze of Long Beach's Foesum have together been staples in the West Coast gangster rap scene since the G-funk era of the 1990s. DJ Babu (born Chris Oroc) has gained notoriety for his work with the turtablism group Beat Junkies and the alternative hip hop act Dilated Peoples. Many other notable DJ champions from other countries around the world such as Canada, Australia, Japan and Germany have also been of Filipino descent.

Other notable DJs include Joseph "DJ ELITE" Netherland (Hawaiʻi's first hip hop DJ champion in 1990), DJ Kuttin Kandi (the first woman to place in the US finals of the prestigious DMC USA competition in 1998), DJ Roli Rho (1999 East Coast regional DMC Champ/1999 & 2000 Vibe Music Seminar Champion of New York City's 5th Platoon), DJ Icy Ice of Los Angeles' KDAY 93.5 FM, DJ E-Man of Los Angeles' Power 106 FM, DJ Marlino a.k.a. da5footafunk of San Diego's XHITZ-FM Z90.3, DJ Enferno (2003 US DMC Champ/2003 1st runner-up DMC World) and DJ Geometrix of the Trooperz Crew, both from the Washington DC area, and DJ Manila Ice (2007 DMC US finalist) and DJ Jester a.k.a. the Filipino Fist, both from Texas. Two longtime staples for entertainment in Sacramento are DJ Eddie Edul and DJ Billy Lane.

The "raptivists"
Filipino American hip hop also infuses influences from the native Philippine literary art of balagtasan, or Filipino spoken word poetry; although most Filipino American rappers primarily use English or "Taglish" in their lyrics, as opposed to their Philippine-counterparts. In the millennium, underground rap groups such as Blue Scholars, Native Guns (now defunct) and Kontrast have utilized this method in their styles, producing pure hip hop while promoting community activism and social consciousness through their lyrics, earning the title of "raptivists". Some groups, like San Jose, California-based Sons of Rebellion, also unify several communities through their music as they represent the Filipino American, African American, and Muslim experience. Lyrics from Sons of Rebellion have even been used as part of a nationwide high school curriculum, for the technology-based high school SiaTech, and tracks from former Native Guns member Kiwi's album Writes of Passage: Portraits of a Son Rising have also been used in a Filipino-American literature course taught at San Francisco State University. Many socially conscious and community minded Filipino emcees often perform benefit shows to help out the Filipino community locally and internationally. In February 2007, Filipino American emcees Kiwi, Kapatid X, Power Struggle, Praxis Roks, Blue Scholars, and Rhapsodistas joined forces with other Filipino American community artists to perform a 'Stop the Killings' benefit concert in San Francisco to help raise awareness about the political climate in the Philippines. The Stop the Killings event utilized the power of hip hop to expose the numerous killings of innocent people in the Philippines. Blue Scholars and Kiwi went on to do a subsequent Stop the Killings tour, with shows happening in several major cities across the nation.

apl.de.ap (Allan Pineda Lindo)
Perhaps one of the most successful mainstream Filipino-American rappers is the Black Eyed Peas' apl.de.ap, who has released songs such as "The Apl Song" (from Elephunk), "Bebot" (from Monkey Business), and "Mare" (from The E.N.D.) which not only contain Filipino (Tagalog) lyrics but also native Filipino musical elements. Pineda has also founded his own record label, the Los Angeles-based Jeepney Music, to help discover and promote Filipino hip-hop talent from both the United States and the Philippines. "The Apl Song" not only contains elements of Tagalog and Filipino elements, but the track itself according to video producer Christina DeHaven, represents Allan Pineda Lindo's view of the Philippines when he travels back for the first time since he was 14 years old. In the English verses of the song, Pineda describes aspects of Filipino life back home which is seen in the lyrics, "How would you feel if you had to catch your meal, Build a hut to live and to eat and chill in, Having to pump the water outta the ground?". The shifting between Tagalog and English can be interpreted as showing both languages as equal or in an equal hierarchical relationship to one another which is especially important having included another language other than English in an American pop song, even though English is one of the two official languages of the Philippines.

Chad Hugo (producer)
One of the most successful Filipino-American producers is Virginia Beach's Chad Hugo. One half of the popular music production duo the Neptunes, Hugo, with his production partner Pharrell, have laced chart-topping hits for the likes of Jay-Z, Nelly, Gwen Stefani and Snoop Dogg, among many others. He has also collaborated with the Black Eyed Peas' apl.de.ap, making an appearance in apl's music video for "The Apl Song".

Media

Film
The 2000 documentary film Beats, Rhymes and Resistance: Pilipinos and Hip Hop in Los Angeles (produced and directed by Lakandiwa de Leon, Dawn Mabalon and Jonathan Ramos) chronicles the development of hip hop culture among Filipino Americans in Southern California during the 1990s.

Radio

There were two FM stations in the Philippines that played all kinds of R&B, hip hop and rap music. These are the now defunct radio stations Power 108 FM and Blazin' 105.9 FM, which were the stations that recognized the latest and the greatest of the hip hop genre. The former project known as 'Project: Hip hop' was founded in 2002 by three high school friends, namely DJ Caine, MC Satoshi and Quaizy Ileon. Former radio stations such as 89 DMZ are now online radio stations, streaming live on the Internet.

In 2007, Wave 891 eliminated its pop jazz/easy listening format and switched to full hip hop and R&B in order to retain the Pinoy hip hop scene.

References

Philippine styles of music
 
Hip hop genres